Feras Dahboor (Arabic:فراس دحبور) (born 12 June 1997) is a Qatari born-Syrian footballer. He currently plays for Al-Arabi as a left back .

Career
Dahboor started his career at Al-Arabi and is a product of the Al-Arabi's youth system. On 28 July 2017, renewed his contract with Al-Arabi . On 19 August 2017, He suffered a cruciate ligament injury . On 16 20 October 2018, Dahboor made his professional debut for Al-Arabi against Al-Ahli in the Pro League .

External links

References

1997 births
Living people
Qatari footballers
Qatari people of Syrian descent
Naturalised citizens of Qatar
Al-Arabi SC (Qatar) players
Al-Wakrah SC players
Qatar Stars League players
Association football fullbacks
Place of birth missing (living people)